Events from the year 1847 in Denmark.

Incumbents
 Monarch – Christian VIII
 Prime minister – Poul Christian Stemann

Events
 26 June – The first railway line in the Kingdom of Denmark, the railway line from Copenhagen to Roskilde, was completed for the Zealand Railway Company by British engineering company William Radford.
 10 November – The first beer is brewed at J.C. Jacobsen's new Carlsberg brewery on Valby Hill in Copenhagen.

Culture

Art
 Wilhelm Marstrand paints his Italian Osteria Scene.

Births
 8 March – Anton Marius Andersen, American Lutheran minister (died 1941)
 13 October – Maria Feodorovna, Empress of Russia (died 1928)
 21 October – Edvard Brandes, Finance Minister (died 1931)
 3 December – Arthur Ivan Allin, musician (died 1926)

Deaths
 12 November – William Christopher Zeise, chemist (born 1789])
 17 November   Henriette Jørgensen, actress (born 1791)
 17 December  Conrad Christian Bøhndel, painter and lithographer  (born 1779)

References

 
1840s in Denmark
Denmark
Years of the 19th century in Denmark